Koprivna may refer to one of the following villages:

Croatia

 Koprivna, Osijek-Baranja County, a village near Šodolovci, Croatia
 Koprivna, Požega-Slavonia County, a village near Brestovac, Croatia

Bosnia and Herzegovina

 Koprivna (Modriča), in Bosnia and Herzegovina
 Koprivna (Sanski Most), in Bosnia and Herzegovina
 Donja Koprivna, in Bosnia and Herzegovina
 Gornja Koprivna, in Bosnia and Herzegovina
 Koprivna (Zenica), in Bosnia and Herzegovina

Serbia

 Koprivna (Prijepolje), in Serbia

Slovenia

 Koprivna, Črna na Koroškem, in Slovenia